Malaxis seychellarum  is a species of orchid native to the Seychelles Islands in the Indian Ocean. It has small green flowers growing in an elongated array.

References

Flora of Seychelles
Plants described in 1901
seychellarum